Julie O'Toole King (born October 21, 1989) is an American soccer player who plays as a defender. She played college soccer at Auburn University and professionally for the Boston Breakers, North Carolina Courage and Orlando Pride.

Early life and education
King's parents are Kevin and Julie; her siblings are model RJ King, model and former The Amazing Race 21 contestant Caitlin King, and reality TV personality Meghan King Edmonds. King's older sister Caitlin played soccer with her at Auburn for two seasons.

King attended and played for Nerinx Hall High School in Webster Groves, Missouri, where she was an Honor Roll Student. She was a wing-midfielder for St. Louis Scott Gallagher Club Soccer and helped her club team advance to the Region II regional Finals five out of the six years they competed, winning in 2003 and 2005, including winning the National Championship in 2005. King was a 2005 All-Metro honorable mention, 2006 Second Team All-Metro, 2007 All-Midwest honorable mention, a 2007 First Team All-Metro, First Team All-Conference and First Team All-State, 2007 All-Midwest honorable mention, 2008 First Team All-State, All-Metro and All-Conference. She was a second team All-Conference selection in basketball in 2008 and 2007.

Auburn University
King attended and played for Auburn University, where she majored in interdisciplinary studies. Following her four years of soccer with the Auburn Tigers, King also played a single season of basketball with the school.

Auburn statistics
Source

Club career

Boston Breakers 2012–2017
Following the folding of the Women's Professional Soccer (WPS) league, King signed on to play with the Boston Breakers in the Women's Premier Soccer League Elite (WPSL Elite), where she played 14 times for the Breakers, starting nine times. Prior to the start of the inaugural 2013 National Women's Soccer League season, King again signed with the Boston Breakers as a discovery player in March 2013. In 2013, King started all 21 games she appeared in and logged 1,862 minutes.

In 2014, King started all 17 games she appeared in and logged 1,530 minutes, third highest on the team, despite missing 6 games due to injury. She tallied one goal and one assist. Her goal, the first of her professional career, came on April 27, 2014, in a 3–2 win at home over Sky Blue FC. She also registered an assist in the match.

North Carolina Courage 2018–2019
King was selected by the North Carolina Courage as the number 9 draft pick in the Breakers Dispersal Draft on January 30, 2018. King would not play for the Courage in 2018 or 2019 as she was recovering from two ankle operations, and she was released by the Courage on July 18, 2019, without making an appearance for the team.

Orlando Pride, 2019–2020
On August 8, 2019, King was signed by the Orlando Pride. She made her debut for the team two days later at home to Houston Dash. Orlando lost 1–0 with  King receiving a red card in the 61st minute. She was waived at the end of the 2020 season and made available on the re-entry wire but was not picked up.

References

External links
 Auburn University player profile
 NWSL profile
 
 
 

Boston Breakers players
Living people
1989 births
National Women's Soccer League players
Women's Premier Soccer League Elite players
North Carolina Courage players
Orlando Pride players
American women's soccer players
Auburn Tigers women's soccer players
Auburn Tigers women's basketball players
People from Webster Groves, Missouri
Soccer players from St. Louis
Women's association football defenders